In English orthography, the letter ⟨k⟩ normally reflects the pronunciation of [] and the letter ⟨g⟩ normally is pronounced  or "hard" , as in goose, gargoyle and game;  or "soft" , generally before  or , as in giant, ginger and geology; or  in some words of French origin, such as rouge, beige and genre. However, silent ⟨k⟩ and ⟨g⟩ occur because of apheresis, the dropping of the initial sound of a word. These sounds used to be pronounced in Old and Middle English.

Silent (k)
The letter ⟨k⟩ is normally silent (i.e. it does not reflect any sound) when it precedes an ⟨n⟩ at the beginning of a word, as in “knife”, and sometimes by extension in other positions. Exceptions include the town of Knoebels Grove located in Pennsylvania in the United States, the Germanic surname Knaus(s) used by NASCAR crew chief Chad Knaus and former First Lady Melania (Knauss) Trump and also words of foreign origin such as Knesset, the name of the Israeli Parliament, etc.

Silent (g)
While not as common, the letter ⟨g⟩ is also usually silent (i.e. it does not reflect any sound) when preceding an ⟨n⟩ at the beginning or end of a word, as in “gnat”, “campaign” and “design”. In some words borrowed from Romance languages, it may appear within a word, as in “champagne”, where it originally denoted the phoneme ŋ. An exception is the acronym GNU.

In addition, the digraph , in the dominant dialects of Modern English, is almost always either silent (as in “bough”, “thorough”, “furlough”, “night” or "weight") or pronounced  (as in “tough”, “enough“ or “laugh”). It is also occasionally pronounced , such as in Edinburgh. When ⟨gh⟩ occurs at the beginning of a word, it is pronounced hard as in “ghost” and “ghetto".

In a few words of Greek origin, the digraph ⟨gm⟩ is pronounced , with the (g) being silent, such as in “phlegm”, “paradigm” and "diaphragm".

Etymology 
The ⟨kn⟩ and ⟨gn⟩ letter combinations usually indicate a Germanic origin of the word. In Old English, ⟨k⟩ and ⟨g⟩ were not silent when preceding ⟨n⟩. Cognates in other Germanic languages show that the ⟨k⟩ was probably a voiceless velar plosive in Proto-Germanic. For example, the initial ⟨k⟩ is not silent in words such as German Knecht which is a cognate of knight, Knoten which is a cognate of knot, etc.

Likewise, ⟨g⟩ was probably a voiced velar plosive and the initial ⟨g⟩ was not silent: for example, German Gnom, a cognate of gnome, Gneis, a cognate of gneiss, etc.

Examples 
Following is a list of words that include a silent ⟨k⟩ or ⟨g⟩. Plural nouns, as well as compound nouns derived from and containing simple nouns in the list, are ignored. For verbs, only the infinitive form of the verb is given, not any conjugations or derived verbs:

⟨kn⟩

Nouns 
 knack
 knacker
 knackwurst
 knag
 knapsack
 knapweed
 knar
 knave
 knawel
 knee
 kneel
 knell
 knickerbockers
 knickers
 knickknack
 knife
 knight
 knob
 knock
 knoll
 knop
 knosp
 knot
 knout
 knowledge
 knuckle
 knur
 knurl

Verbs 
 beknave
 knap
 knead
 knee
 kneel
 knell
 knight
 knit
 knock
 knot
 know
 knurl

Others 
 knackered
 knaggy
 knavish
 knotty
 known
 knurly
 tightknit
 unbeknown
 antiknock

⟨gn⟩ 
 align
 benign
 campaign
 design
 gnar
 gnarl
 gnarr
 gnash
 gnat
 gnathic
 gnathite
 gnaw
 gneiss
 gnome
 gnomon
 gnosis
 gnostic
 gnotobiotics
 gnu (animal name)
 reign
 sign

See also 
 Silent letter
 Silent e

References

K
Phonotactics
K